Parupaka is a village in Rowthulapudi Mandal, Kakinada district in the state of Andhra Pradesh in India.

Geography 

Demographics 
 India census, Parupaka had a population of 2,336, out of which 1175 were male and 1161 were female. Population of children below 6 years of age were 269. The literacy rate of the village is 43.59%.

References 

Villages in Rowthulapudi mandal